Vitali Olegovich Kalenkovich (born 3 March 1993) is a Russian professional football player.

Club career
He made his Russian Football National League debut for FC Baltika Kaliningrad on 2 May 2012 in a game against FC SKA-Energiya Khabarovsk.

External links
 

1993 births
Sportspeople from Kaliningrad
Living people
Russian footballers
Association football midfielders
FC Baltika Kaliningrad players
PFC Krylia Sovetov Samara players
FC Tom Tomsk players
JK Narva Trans players
FC Salyut Belgorod players
Russian First League players
Meistriliiga players
Russian expatriate footballers
Expatriate footballers in Estonia
Russian expatriate sportspeople in Estonia